Theodore Brown may refer to:

 Theodore L. Brown (born 1928), American chemist, university administrator, and philosopher of science
 Theodore M. Brown, American professor of public health and policy, medical humanities and history
 Steve Brown (bass player) (Theodore Brown, 1890–1965), American jazz musician
 Ted Brown (radio) (Theodore David Brown, 1924–2005), American radio personality
 Ted Brown (saxophonist) (Theodore G. Brown, born 1927), American jazz musician

See also
 Ted Brown (disambiguation)